Last King of the Cross is an Australian television drama series on Paramount+. The series is inspired by the autobiography of nightclub owner John Ibrahim and his experiences in Sydney's Kings Cross. The series is produced by Helium Pictures and will be distributed internationally through Cineflix Rights.

Premise
The 10-part drama series follows John Ibrahim's journey from early poverty to later success.

Cast

 Lincoln Younes as John Ibrahim
 Tim Roth as Ezra Shipman
 Callan Mulvey as Detective Sergeant Brian Crellan
 Claude Jabbour as Sam Ibrahim
 Tess Haubrich as Elizabeth Doyle
 Matt Nable as Anthony 'Big Tony' Stone
 Maria Tran as Madame Tien
 Kevin Khan as Anh Tien
 Hoa Xuande as Romeo
 Damian Walshe-Howling as Joey Romano
 Wesley Patten  as Brett
 Jake Ryan as Gibbo
 Ethan Lamb-Kelly as a teenage Dave Campbell
 Tony Nikolakopoulos as Fat George
 Setareh Naghoni as Wahiba Ibrahim
 Simon Elrahi as Peter 'PK' Kay
 Robert Rabiah as Jamour Ibrahim 
 Justin Rosniak as Declan Mooney
 Wadih Dona as Nasa Kalouri
 Allegra Monk as Molly Lewellyn 
 Malek Alkoni as teenage John Ibrahim
 Brandon Nguyen as Bui Doi Kid #2
 Daniel Widdowson as Clarkey
 Joseph Frangie as Angelo Lombardi

Episodes

References

External links
 

2023 Australian television series debuts
2020s Australian comedy television series
English-language television shows
Paramount+ original programming